Ferriter is a surname of Irish origin. People with that name include:

 Diarmaid Ferriter (born 1973), Irish historian
 Jack Ferriter (active 1990s), Irish Gaelic footballer
 John Ferriter (1960–2019), American television producer and talent manager and scout
 Michael Ferriter (active from 1979), United States Army Lieutenant General
 Roger Ferriter (active from 1969), American graphic designer
 Sean Ferriter (active  1960s), Gaelic footballer

See also
 Ferrater, a surname
 Ferriter's Cove, a small bay located at the westernmost point of Dingle Peninsula, in County Kerry, Ireland
 Ferriters Cove Formation, a geologic formation in Ireland
 Piaras Feiritéar ( – 1653), Irish poet
 

Surnames of Irish origin
Anglicised Irish-language surnames